2015 in sports describes the year's events in world sport. This year, some sporting events listed below are qualifying ones, for athletes, to compete at the 2016 Summer Olympics and Paralympics in Rio de Janeiro. From July 2015 to May 2016, the venues for the 2016 Summer Olympics and Paralympics will be tested, by hosting various events in them.

Calendar by month

January

February

March

April

May

June

July

August

September

October

November

December

Air sports
 February 13 – October 13: 2015 Red Bull Air Race World Championship
 February 13 & 14: 2015 Red Bull Air Race of Abu Dhabi in  Abu Dhabi
 Open Master Class winner:  Paul Bonhomme
 Open Challenger Class winner:  Cristian Bolton
 May 16 & 17: 2015 Red Bull Air Race of Chiba in  Chiba
 Open Master Class winner:  Paul Bonhomme
 Open Challenger Class winner:  Petr Kopfstein
 May 30 & 31: 2015 Red Bull Air Race of Rovinj in  Rovinj
 Open Master Class winner:  Hannes Arch
 Open Challenger Class winner:  Daniel Ryfa
 July 4 & 5: 2015 Red Bull Air Race of Budapest in  Budapest
 Open Master Class winner:  Hannes Arch
 Open Challenger Class winner:  Daniel Ryfa
 August 15 & 16: 2015 Red Bull Air Race of Ascot in  Ascot
 Open Master Class winner:  Paul Bonhomme
 Open Challenger Class winner:  Petr Kopfstein
 September 5 & 6: 2015 Red Bull Air Race of Spielberg in  Spielberg
 Open Master Class winner:  Matt Hall
 Open Challenger Class winner:  Mikaël Brageot
 September 26 & 27: 2015 Red Bull Air Race of Fort Worth in  Fort Worth
 Open Master Class winner:  Paul Bonhomme
 Open Challenger Class winner:  Mikaël Brageot
 October 17 & 18: 2015 Red Bull Air Race of Las Vegas in  Las Vegas
 Open Master Class winner:  Matt Hall
 Open Challenger Class winner:  Mikaël Brageot

World Championships
 January 13–24: AirSports FAI Paragliding World Championships 2015 in  Roldanillo
 Open Individual Cross Country winner:  Honorin Hamard
 Women's Individual Cross-Country winner:  Seiko Fukuoka Naville
 Open Team Cross Country winners:  (Torsten Siegel, Marc Wensauer, Ulrich Prinz, Andreas "Pepe" Malecki, Yvonne Dathe)
 February 28 – March 13: AirSports FAI Hang Gliding Class 1 World Championships 2015 in  Valle de Bravo
 Open Individual Hang Gliding winner:  Christian Ciech
 Open Team Hang Gliding winners:  (Christian Ciech, Filippo Oppici, Davide Guiducci, Suan Selenati, Tullio Gervasoni, Valentino Baù)
 June 27 – July 2: Air Sports FAI Paramotor Slalom World Championships 2015 in  Legnica
 Open Paraglider Control Foot Launched Flown Solo winner:  Jérémy Penone
 Open Team winners: 
 Open Paraglider Control Landplane Flown Solo winner:  Wojtek Bógdał
 Mixed Paraglider Control Landplane Flown winners: 
 July 20–24: Air Sports FAI Precision Flying World Championships 2015 in  Skive
 Open Individual winner:  Damien Vadon
 Open Individual Landing Trophy winner:  Mauri Hälinen
 Open Individual Navigation Trophy winner:  Marcin Skalik
 Open Team Trophy winners:  (Marcin Skalik, Bolesław Radomski, Michał Wieczorek)
 Open Team Landing Trophy winners:  (Tomáš Rajdl, David Černý, Jiří Jakeš)
 August 2–13: Women's Air Sports FAI Gliding World Championships 2015 in  Arnborg
 Women's 15 meters Class winner:  Anne Ducarouge
 Women's Club Class winner:  Sabrina Vogt
 Women's Standard Class winner:  Aude Grangeray
 August 2–15: Air Sports FAI 13.5m Class Gliding World Championships 2015 in  Pociūnai Airport
 Open 13.5m Class winner:  Stefano Ghiorzo
 August 5–15: Air Sports FAI Glider Aerobatic World Championships 2015 in  Zbraslavice Airport
 Open Unlimited winner:  Ferenc Tóth
 Open Team Unlimited winners:  (Přemysl Vávra, Miroslav Červenka, Lucie Pešková)
 Open Advanced winner:  Miroslav Černý
 Open Team Advanced winners:  (Sławomir Talowski, Katarzyna Żmudziński, Michał Andrzejewski)
 August 9–16: Air Sports FAI Aerobatic Model Aircraft World Championships 2015 in  Dübendorf
 Open F3A winner:  Christophe Paysant-Leroux
 Open Junior F3A winner:  Joseph Szczur
 Open Team F3A winners: 
 August 9–17: Air Sports FAI Paragliding Accuracy World Championships 2015 in  Puncak
 Men's Individual winner:  Dede Supratman
 August 13–16: Air Sports FAI Helicopter World Championships 2015 in  Przylep
 Open Helicopter winners:  (Maxim Sotnikov, Oleg Puajukas)
 Women's Helicopter winners:  (Liudmila Kosenkova, Elena Prokofyeva)
 Open Team winners: 
 August 20–29: Air Sports FAI Aerobatic World Championships 201 in  Châteauroux
 Men's Unlimited winner:  Alexandre Orlowski
 Women's Unlimited winner:  Aude Lemordant
 August 26–28: Air Sports FAI F1E For Free Flight Model Aircraft World Championships 2015 in  Zlatibor
 Open Junior Individual F1E winner:  Viktoria Drmlova
 Open Junior Team F1E winners: 
 Open Individual F1E winner  Jaromir Orel
 Open Team F1E winners: 
 September 5–12: Air Sports FAI Sailplane Grand Prix World Championships 2015 in  Varese
 Open Individual winner:  Maximilian Seis
 October 21–24: Air Sports FAI Indoor Skydiving World Championships 2015 in  Prague
 Open Freestyle winners: 
 Open Junior Freestyle winners: 
 Open Formation Skydiving 4-Way winners: 
 Women's Formation Skydiving 4-Way winners: 
 Open Vertical Formation Skydiving winners: 
 December 1–12: Air Sports FAI Junior Gliding World Championships 2015 in  Narromine
 Open Club Class winner:  Tom Arscott
 Open Standard Class winner:  Matthew Scutter
 December 1–12: FIA World Air Games 2015 in  Dubai
 Gold and total medal winner:

Alpine skiing

Amateur boxing

American football

 Super Bowl XLIX – the New England Patriots (AFC) won 28–24 over the Seattle Seahawks (NFC)
Location: University of Phoenix Stadium
Attendance: 70,288
MVP: Tom Brady, QB (New England)

Aquatics

Archery

Indoor
 November 8, 2014 – February 8, 2015: 2014–15 WA Indoor Archery Calendar
 November 8 & 9, 2014: Indoor Archery World Cup #1 in  Marrakesh
  and  won 2 gold medals each. France won the overall medal tally.
 December 6 & 7, 2014: Indoor Archery World Cup #2 in  Bangkok
  and the  won 2 gold medals each. The United States won the overall medal tally.
 January 23–25, 2015: Indoor Archery World Cup #3 in  Nîmes
  and  won 2 gold medals each. South Korea won the overall medal tally.
 February 6 – 8, 2015: Indoor Archery World Cup #4 (final) in  Las Vegas
  won both the gold and overall medal tallies.

Other indoor archery championships
 December 8 & 9, 2014: Indoor Para Archery World Cup in  Bangkok
  and the  won 1 gold medal each.  won the overall medal tally.
 February 24 – 28: European Indoor Archery Championships in  Koper
Italy won the overall medal tally.

Outdoor
 May 5 – October 25: 2015 WA Outdoor Archery Calendar
 May 5 – 10: Outdoor Archery World Cup #1 in  Shanghai
  won both the gold and overall medal tallies.
 May 26 – 31: Outdoor Archery World Cup #2 in  Antalya
  won both the gold and overall medal tallies.
 August 11–16: Outdoor Archery World Cup #3 in  Wrocław
 The  won both the gold and overall medal tallies.
 September 8–13: Outdoor Archery World Cup #4 in  Medellín
  won the gold medal tally. The  won the overall medal tally.
 October 24 & 25: Outdoor Archery World Cup Final in  Mexico City
  won the gold medal tally. South Korea and  won 3 overall medals each.

Other outdoor archery championships
 June 8–14: 2015 World Archery Youth Championships in  Yankton, South Dakota
  won the gold medal tally. The  won the overall medal tally.
 July 26 – August 2: 2015 World Archery Championships in  Copenhagen
  won both the gold and overall medal tallies.
 August 23–30: 2015 World Archery Para Championships in  Donaueschingen
  won the gold medal tally. China and  won 10 overall medals each.
 September 1–5: 2015 World Archery 3D Championships in  Terni
  and  won 3 gold medals each. Italy won the overall medal tally.
  won both the gold and overall medal tallies.
 October 3 & 4: European Club Team Cup in  Riom
 Men's Team winners:  Archers Riomois (Paul Bonneau, Thomas Antoine, Lucas Daniel)
 Women's Team winners:  La Sentinelle Brienon (Josée Auboeuf, Bérengère Schuh, Laura Ruggieri)
 October 6–10: 2015 European Field Archery Championships in  Rzeszów
  won both the gold and overall medal tallies.
 November 1–8: 2015 Asian Archery Championships in  Bangkok
  won both the gold and overall medal tallies.
 November 10–19: 2015 Asian Para Archery Championships in  Bangkok
  won both the gold and overall medal tallies.

Association football

Athletics (track and field)

Badminton

Bandy

Baseball

Basketball

Beach soccer
 January 23 – December 20: 2015 Beach Soccer Worldwide Calendar of Events
 January 23–25: Copa Beach Soccer Viña del Mar 2015 in 
 Winner: 
 February 1 – 8: 2015 Copa Sudamericana de Beach Soccer in  Recife
  defeated  12–2.  took third place.
 March 6–8: 2015 Power Horse Beach Soccer African Trophy in  Durban
  defeated  5–4.  took third place.
 March 23–28: 2015 AFC Beach Soccer Championship in  Doha
  defeated , 3–2 in penalties and after a 1–1 score in regular play, to win their first AFC Beach Soccer Championship title.  took third place.
 March 28 – April 4: 2015 CONCACAF Beach Soccer Championship in  San Salvador
  defeated , 4–0, to win their third CONCACAF Beach Soccer Championship title. Host nation, took third place.
 April 14 – 19: 2015 CAF Beach Soccer Championship in  Roche Caiman
  defeated , 2–1 in penalty shots and after a 1–1 tie in regular play, to win their first CAF Beach Soccer Championships title.  took third place.
 April 19 – 26: 2015 CONMEBOL Beach Soccer Championship in  Manta, Ecuador
  defeated , 8–3, to win their fifth CONMEBOL Beach Soccer Championship title.  took third place. 
  FC Lokomotiv Moscow defeated  CR Flamengo, 6–4, to win the inaugural Barcelona Beach Soccer Cup title.  FC Barcelona took third place.
 June 2–7: Euro Winners Cup 2015 in  Catania
  BSC Kristall (KRS) defeated  DomusBet BS Catania (CTN), 6–2, to win their second consecutive Euro Winners Cup title.  FC Vybor (FCV) took third place. 
 July 18 & 19: Euro Nationscup Linz 2015 in 
 The  defeated , 3–2 in penalty shots and after a 3–3 score in regular play, in the final.  took third place. 
 July 24–26: Friendship Cup 2015 in 
  defeated , 3–2, in the final.  took third place.
 August 14–16: BSWW Tour El Jadida 2015 in 
 Winner: 
 September 2–6: Mediterranean Beach Games Pescara 2015 in 
  defeated , 5–1, in the final.  took third place.
 September 18–20: Istanbul Beach Soccer Cup 2015 in 
 Winner:  Al-Ahli Club 
 November 3–7: Samsung Beach Soccer Intercontinental Cup Dubai 2015 in the 
  defeated , 5–2, in the final.  took third place.
 December 9–13: IV Mundialito de Clubes Beach Soccer in  Barra da Tijuca, Rio de Janeiro
  FC Barcelona defeated  CR Vasco da Gama, 3–2 in penalties and after a 4–4 score in regular play, in the final.  Al-Ahli took third place.
 December 18–20: BSWW Tour Copa Lagos 2015 in 
 Winner:

Euro Beach Soccer League
 June 12 – August 23: 2015 Euro Beach Soccer League
 June 12–14: #1 in  Moscow
 Group 1 winners: 
 Group 2 winners: 
 Note: With the group winners, and  all qualified to compete in the Super Final.
 August 7–9: #2 in  Siófok
 Division A winners: 
 Division B Group 1 winners: 
 Division B Group 2 winners: 
 Note 1: With the division winners,  and  qualify for the Super Final. 
 August 20–23: Euro Beach Soccer League Superfinal & Promotion Final Pärnu 2015 in 
 Superfinal:  defeated , 5–4, in the final match.  took third place.
 Promotional Final:  defeated , 3–2 in penalties and after a 6–6 tie in regular play, in the final match. The  took third place.

FIFA Beach Soccer World Cup
 July 9–19: 2015 FIFA Beach Soccer World Cup in  Espinho at the Praia da Baía
  defeated , 5–3, to win their second FIFA Beach Soccer World Cup title.  took third place.

Beach volleyball

Biathlon

BMX racing

Bobsleigh and Skeleton

Boccia
 March 30 – April 5: 2015 Boccia European Continental Cup in  Sant Cugat del Vallès (debut event)
 Individual BC1 winner:  Panagiotis Soulanis
 Individual BC2 winner:  Nigel Murray
 Individual BC3 winner:  Jacob Thomas
 Individual BC4 winner:  Keiran Steer
 Pairs BC3 winners: 
 Pairs BC4 winners: 
 BC1/BC2 Team winners: 
 April 29 – May 4: 2015 Boccia Americas Team and Pairs Championships in  Montreal
 Pairs BC3 winners: 
 Pairs BC4 winners: 
 BC1/BC2 Team winners: 
 June 10–14: 2015 Boccia Asia/Oceania Team & Pairs Championships in 
 Pairs BC3 winners: 
 Pairs BC4 winners: 
 BC1/BC2 Team winners: 
 June 17–22: 2015 Boccia World Open #1 in  Poznań
 Individual BC1 winner:  Daniel Pérez
 Individual BC2 winner:  Maciel Santos
 Individual BC3 winner:  Grigorios Polychronidis
 Individual BC4 winner:  Domingos Vieira
 Pairs BC3 winners: 
 Pairs BC4 winners: 
 BC1/BC2 Team winners: 
 July 17–23: 2015 Boccia World Open #2 in  Seoul
 Individual BC1 winner:  Pattaya Tadtong
 Individual BC2 winner:  Worawut Saengampa
 Individual BC3 winner:  Jeong Ho-won
 Individual BC4 winner:  Leung Yuk-wing
 Pairs BC3 winners: 
 Pairs BC4 winners: 
 BC1/BC2 Team winners: 
 July 25 & 26: 2015 Boccia European Team and Pairs Championships in  Guildford
 Pairs BC3 winners: 
 Pairs BC4 winners: 
 BC1/BC2 Team winners: 
 August 7–15: 2015 Boccia Americas Continental Cup in  Toronto (with the 2015 Parapan American Games)
 Individual BC1 winner:  Jose Carlos Chagas
 Individual BC2 winner:  Maciel de Souza Santos
 Individual BC3 winner:  Richardson Santos
 Individual BC4 winner:  Eliseu dos Santos
 Pairs BC3 winners: 
 Pairs BC4 winners: 
 BC1/BC2 Team winners: 
 October 28 – November 3: 2015 Boccia World Open #3 in  Cali
 Individual BC1 winner:  Daniel Pérez
 Individual BC2 winner:  Yan Zhiqiang
 Individual BC3 winner:  José Macedo
 Individual BC4 winner:  Pornchok Larpyen
 Pairs BC3 winners: 
 Pairs BC4 winners: 
 BC1/BC2 Team winners: 
 Individual BC1 winner:  David Smith
 Individual BC2 winner:  Maciel dos Santos
 Individual BC3 winner:  Hygor Santos
 Pairs BC3 winners:  
 BC1/BC2 Team winners:

Canadian football
 November 28 – 51st Vanier Cup in  Quebec City
 The  UBC Thunderbirds defeated the  Montreal Carabins, 26–23, to win their fourth Vanier Cup title. 
 November 29 – 103rd Grey Cup in  Winnipeg
 The Edmonton Eskimos defeated the Ottawa Redblacks, 26–20, to win their 14th Grey Cup title.

Canoeing

Chess
 February 14 – December 20: 2015 FIDE (World Chess Federation) Calendar

Majors
 October 1, 2014 – May 27, 2015: FIDE Grand Prix 2014–15
 October 1–15, 2014: #1 FIDE Grand Prix in  Baku
 Winners:  Fabiano Caruana 6.5/11 (+4=5–2) and  Boris Gelfand 6.5/11 (+3=7–1).
 October 20 – November 3, 2014: #2 FIDE Grand Prix in  Tashkent
 Winner:  Dmitry Andreikin 7/11 (+3=8–0)
 February 14–28, 2015: #3 FIDE Grand Prix in  Tbilisi
 Winner:  Evgeny Tomashevsky 8/11 (+5=6–0)
 May 13–27: #4 FIDE Grand Prix (final) in  Khanty-Mansiysk
 Winners: ,  and  6.5/11
 February 24 – March 4: World Senior Team Chess Championship 2015 in  Dresden
 (50+) W: 
 (65+) W: 
 (Women's) W:  Women 1
 March 16 – April 7: Women's World Chess Championship 2015 in  Sochi
 In the final  Mariya Muzychuk defeated  Natalia Pogonina 2½ – 1½.
 April 13–22: World Amateur Chess Championship 2015 in  Chalkidiki
 Men's winner:  Mire Deniz Dogan
 Women's winner:  Paula-Alexandra Gitu
 April 18–28: Men's World Team Chess Championship in  Tsaghkadzor
 Winners:  (Ding Liren, Yu Yangyi, Bu Xiangzhi, Wei Yi, Wang Chen)
 April 18–29: Women's World Team Championship 2015 in  Chengdu
 Winners:  (Bela Khotenashvili, Lela Javakhishvili, Meri Arabidze, Nino Batsiashvili, Salome Melia)
 May 6–15: World Schools Individual Championships 2015 in  Pattaya

  won both the gold and overall medal tallies.
 September 1–16: World Junior U20 Championships 2015 in  Khanty-Mansiysk
 Men's winner:  Mikhail Antipov
 Women's winner:  Nataliya Buksa
 September 10 – October 4: Chess World Cup 2015 in  Baku
 Winner:  Sergey Karjakin
 October 2–16: Women's FIDE Grand Prix 2015–16 #1 stage in  Monte Carlo
 Winner:  Hou Yifan
 October 9–15: World Rapid and Blitz Championships 2015 in  Berlin
 Rapid Winner:  Magnus Carlsen
 Blitz Winner:  Alexander Grischuk
 October 24 – November 5: World Youth and Cadets Championships 2015 in  
  won both the gold and overall medal tallies.
 November 9–22: World Senior Chess Championship 2015 in  Acqui Terme
 Men's 65+ winner:  Vladimir Okhotnik
 Women's 65+ winner:  Nona Gaprindashvili
 Men's 50+ winner:  Predrag Nikolić
 Women's 50+ winner:  Galina Strutinskaia

European Events
 February 23 – March 9: 2015 European Individual Chess Championship in  Jerusalem
 Winner:  Evgeniy Najer
 April 18–26: European Small Nations Team Chess Championship 2015 in  St. Peter Port
 Winners: 
 April 28 – May 8: European Senior Chess Championship 2015 in  Eretria
 Seniors +50:  Zurab Sturua
 Seniors +65:  Jan Rooze
 Women's Seniors +50:  Svetlana Mednikova
 Women's Seniors +65:  Nona Gaprindashvili
 May 18–31: European Women's Championship 2015 in  Chakvi
 Winner:  Natalia Zhukova
 June 24 – July 3: European Schools Championship 2015 in  Konya
  won both the gold and overall medal tallies.
 July 12–20: European Senior Team Championship 2015 in  Vienna
 Winner: 
 July 13–19: European Youth Team Chess Championship 2015 in  Karpacz
 Winner: 
 July 31 – August 6: European Youth Rapid and Blitz Championships 2015 in  Novi Sad

  won both the gold and overall medal tallies.
 August 8–16: European Amateur Championship 2015 in  Kaunas
 Men's winner:  Lukas Jonkus
 Women's winner:  Marina Malisauskiene
 Blitz tournament winner:  Laurynas Miknevicius
 September 20 – October 1: European Youth U8 – U18 Championship 2015 in  Poreč
  won both the gold and overall medal tallies.
 October 6–10: European Universities Chess Championship 2015 in  Yerevan
 Men's winner:  Sanan Sjugirov
 Women's winner:  Daria Pustovoitova
 October 17–25: European Club Cup 2015 in  Skopje
 Winner:  Siberia
 October 17–25: European Club Cup for Women 2015 in  Skopje
 Winner:  Nona
 November 12–22: European Team Chess Championship 2015 in  Reykjavík
 Men's winners: 
 Women's winners: 
 December 17–20: European Rapid and Blitz Championships 2015 in  Minsk
 Rapid winner:  Ivan Popov
 Blitz winner:  Rauf Mamedov

American Zonals
 March 31 – April 13: American Zonal 2.1 Open & Women in  St. Louis
 Winners:  Hikaru Nakamura (m) /  Irina Krush (f)
 March 31 – April 6: American Zonal 2.3 Open in  Santa Elena
 Winner:  Lázaro Bruzón
 April 20–27: American Zonal 2.4 in  Lima
 Winner:  Jorge Cori
 April 27 – May 3: American Zonal 2.5 in  Asunción
 Winner:  Sandro Mareco
 July 9–16: American Zonal 2.2 in  Guelph
 Winner:  Tomas Krnan
 November 5–13: American Zonal 2.5 Women in  Villa Martelli
 Winner:  Carolina Lujan

American Events
 April 2–7: CARIFTA Games in  Christ Church
 April 22–28: South American Junior U20 Championship 2015 in  Santander
 Boys' winner:  Julio Benedetti
 Girls' winner:  Jorcerys Montilla Reyes
 May 15–24: American Continental Chess Championship 2015 in  Montevideo
 Men's winner:  Sandro Mareco
 June 27 – July 4: Panamerican Youth Festival & Blitz in  Bogotá
 :  (131 points)
 :  (112 p.)
 :  (101 p.)
 July 25–30: North American Junior U20 Championship 2015 in  Kitchener
 Men's winner:  Kesav Viswanadha
 Women's winner:  Agata Bykovtsev
 July 28–30: Central American & Caribbean Team Chess Championship 2015 in  Managua
 Winner: 
 Women's winner: 
 Blitz winner: 
 Women's Blitz winner: 
 August 14–19: Central American & Caribbean Youth Chess Championships 2015 in  Port of Spain
  won both the gold and overall medal tallies.
 August 19–26: Panamerican Amateur Chess Championships 2015 in  Chuquisaca
 August 21–29: Central American & Caribbean Junior U20 Chess Championships 2015 in  Porlamar
 Men's winner:  Augusto César Campos Jiménez
 Women's winner:  Rovira Contreras Tairu Manuel
 August 21–29: Panamerican Senior Chess Championship 2015 in  Porlamar
 Men's +50 winner:  David H. Cummings
 Men's +65 winner:  Anibal Gamboa Gonzalez
 August 31 – September 7: Panamerican Junior U20 Championship 2015 in  San Salvador
 Boys' winner:  Kevin Cori Quispe
 Girls' winner:  Ashritha Eswaran
 December 2–7: South American Youth Festival 2015 in  Santa Cruz de la Sierra
  won both the gold.  overall medal tallies.

Asian Zonals
 March 6–16: Asian Zonal 3.3 in  Ho Chi Minh City
 Winners:  Lê Quang Liêm (m) /  Phạm Lê Thảo Nguyên (f)
 March 26 – April 2: Asian Zonal 3.2 in  Kathmandu
 Winners:  Ziaur Rahman (m) /  Akter Liza Shamima (f)
 May 16–25: Asian Zonal 3.1 in  Muscat
 Winners:  Pouya Idani (m) /  Zhu Chen (f)
 June 3–12: Asian Zonal 3.4 in  Dushanbe
 Winners:  Rinat Jumabayev (m) /  Dinara Saduakassova (f)
 June 30 – July 6: Asian Zonal 3.5 Women in  Zhongshan
 Winner:  Tan Zhongyi
 July 4–10: Asian Zonal 3.6 in  Sydney
 Winners:  Max Illingworth (m) /  Emma Guo (f)

Asian Events
 May 30 – June 8: 11th Asian Schools Chess Championships 2015 in 
 Winners: The  won both the gold.  won overall medal tallies.
 June 8–17: ASEAN+ Age Group Championships 2015 in 
 Winners:  won both the gold and overall medal tallies.
 July 21–28: Asian Cities Team Championships 2015 in  Colombo
 Winner:  Bangalore
 August 1–13: Asian Continental Championships 2015 in  Al Ain
 Men's winner:  Salem A.R. Saleh
 Women's winner:  Mitra Hejazipour
 Men's Rapid winner:  Nguyễn Ngọc Trường Sơn
 Women's Rapid Winner:  Tan Zhongyi
 Men's Blitz winner:  Salem A.R. Saleh
 Women's Blitz winner:  Zhu Chen
 September 6–13: Asian Amateur Championship 2015 in  Bandar Seri Begawan
 Winner:  T. Shyam Sundar
 Blitz winner:  Shahzod Akhidov
 September 24 – October 2: Asian Seniors Championship 2015 in  Larestan
 Men's +50 winner:  Mahmood Lodhi
 Men's +65 winner:  Wazeer Ahmad Khan
 Women's +50 winner:  Helen Milligan
 Women's +65 winner:  Bakhyt Badamshina
 October 3–10: Asian Juniors and Girls U20 Championship 2015 in  Bishkek
 Boys' winner:  Masoud Mosadeghpour
 Girls' winner:  Gulrukhbegim Tokhirjonova
 November 23 – December 5: Asian Youth U8, 10, 12, 14, 16, 18 Championship 2015 in  Seoul
  won both the gold and overall medal tallies.

African Zonals
 March 13–22: African Zonal 4.4 in  Lomé
 Winner:  Bomo Kigigha (m) /  Omolabake Coker (f)
 March 25 – April 1: African Zonal 4.1 in  Hammamet
 Winners:  Mohamed Amine Haddouche (m) /  Amina Mezioud (f)
 April 17–26: African Zonal 4.3 in  Blantyre
 Winners:  Daniel Jere (m) /  Lorita Mwango (f)
 April 17–26: African Zonal 4.2 in  Kampala
 Winners:  Essam El-Gindy (m) /  Eman Elansary (f)

African Events
 May 1–13: African Individual Championships 2015 in  Cairo
 Men's winner:  Bassem Amin
 Women's winner:  Mona Khaled
 July 31 – August 10: African Amateur Championships 2015 in  Maputo
 Open Category winner:  Thuso Mosutha
 Women Section winner:  Phylis Namasiku Mwilola
 August 14–23: African Schools Individual Championships 2015 in  Dar es Salaam
  won both the gold and overall medal tallies.
 December 4–14: African Youth Championships 2015 in  Livingstone
  won both the gold and overall medal tallies.
 December 27, 2015 – 6 January 2016: African Junior Championships 2015 in  Mahé
 Boys' winner:  David Silva
 Girls' winner:  Shahenda Wafa

Cricket
  defeated , by seven wickets, to win their fifth Cricket World Cup title.
 July 8–12: First test at the SWALEC Stadium in  Cardiff
 July 16–20: Second test at the Lord's Cricket Ground in  London
 July 29 – August 2: Third test at the Edgbaston Cricket Ground in  Birmingham
 August 6–10: Fourth test at Trent Bridge in  Nottingham
 August 20–24: Fifth and final test at The Oval in  London

Cross-country skiing

Curling

Cyclo-cross biking

Darts

Equestrianism

Fencing

Field hockey

FIH Hockey World League
 June 21, 2014 – December 13, 2015: 2014–15 Women's FIH Hockey World League (final will be held in  Rosario)
  defeated , 5–1, to win their first Women's FIH Hockey World League title.  took third place.
 July 1, 2014 – December 6, 2015: 2014–15 Men's FIH Hockey World League (final will be held in  Raipur)
  defeated , 2–1, to win their first Men's FIH Hockey World League title.  took third place.

Indoor Hockey World Cup
 February 4 – 8: 2015 Indoor Hockey World Cup for Men and Women in  Leipzig
 Men: The  defeated , 3–2, to win their first Men's Indoor Hockey World Cup title.  took third place.
 Women: The  defeated , 1–0 in a penalty shoot-out and after a 1–1 score in regular play, to win their second Women's Indoor Hockey World Cup title. The  took third place.

2016 Summer Olympics
 Men's team winners: 
 Women's team winners:

European Hockey Federation (EHF)
 January 16 – August 30: EHF's Eurohockey 2015 Season 
 January 16–18: EHF Junior Indoor European Championship 2015 in  Toruń
  defeated , 2–1, in a shoot-out and after a 2–2 score in regular play.  took third place.
 January 16–18: EHF Junior Indoor European Championship II 2015 in  Sveti Ivan Zelina
 Winner:  (16 points, with a GD of 57)
 Second:  (16 points, with a GD of 33)
 Third:  (12 points)
 January 23–25: Women's EHF Junior Indoor European Championship 2015 in  Prague
  defeated , with the score of 5–3 in the final.  took third place.
 February 13 – 15: 2015 MWB EuroHockey Indoor Club Cup in  Mülheim
  HTC Uhlenhorst Mülheim defeated  SV Arminen, 5–4, in the final.  C.H. SPV Complutense took third place.
 February 13 – 15: 2015 EuroHockey Indoor Club Trophy in  Kongens Lyngby
  WKS Grunwald Poznań and  HC Bohemians Prague are promoted to the EuroHockey Indoor Club Champions Cup 2016.
  Orient Lyngby and  HAHK Mladost are relegated to the EuroHockey Indoor Club Champions Challenge I 2016.
 February 13 – 15: 2015 EuroHockey Indoor Club Challenge I in  Rotterdam
  HC Rotterdam and  A.D. Lousada are promoted to the EuroHockey Indoor Club Champions Trophy 2016.
  HC Lipovci and  Soroksari HC are relegated to the EuroHockey Indoor Club Champions Challenge II 2016.
 February 13 – 15: 2015 EuroHockey Indoor Club Challenge II in  Varna
  HC NSA Sofia and  HC Kilppari are promoted to the EuroHockey Indoor Club Challenge I 2016.
 February 20 – 22: 2015 Women's EuroHockey Indoor Club Cup in  Šiauliai
  UHC Hamburg defeated  Club de Campo, 8–0, in the final.  MSC Sumchanka took third place.
 February 20 – 22: 2015 Women's EuroHockey Indoor Club Trophy in  Vienna
 Winner:  SV Arminen (26 points, with a GD of 14)
 Second:  HC Ritm-Azot Grodno (26 points, with a GD of 11)
 Third:  HC Rotweiss Wettingen (22 points)
 February 20 – 22: 2015 Women's EuroHockey Indoor Club Challenge I in  Ankara
 Winner:  Slagelse HC (25 points)
 Second:  Keçiören Bağlum SK (21 points)
 Third:  HC NSA Sofia (16 points)
 April 1 – 6: EuroHockey League 2014–2015 KO16 and Final Four in  Bloemendaal
  MHC Oranje Zwart defeated  UHC Hamburg, 6–5, in a shoot-out and after a score of 2–2 in regular play, to claim their first EuroHockey League title.  HC Bloemendaal took third place.
 April 3 – 6: 2015 Women's EuroHockey Club Champions Cup in  Bilthoven
  SCHC defeated fellow Dutch team, HC 's-Hertogenbosch, 3–2 in a shoot-out and after a score of 2–2 in regular play, in the final.  Club de Campo took third place.
 May 21 – 24: 2015 Women's EuroHockey Club Champions Trophy in  Minsk
  UHC Hamburg defeated  Royal Wellington THC, 10–1, in the final.  HC Minsk took third place.
 May 22 – 25: 2015 Men's EuroHockey Club Champions Trophy in  Dublin
  SC Stroitel Brest defeated  SK Slavia Praha, 3–1, in the final.  Atasport took third place.
 July 19–25: 2015 EuroHockey U18 Championships for Boys and Girls in  Santander
 Girls: The  defeated , 6–1, in the final.  took third place.
 August 21–30: 2015 EuroHockey Nations Championship for Men and Women in  London
 Men: The  defeated , 6–1, to win their fourth Men's EuroHockey Nations Championship title.  took third place.

Asian Hockey Federation (AsHF)
 May 11 – 17: 2015 Men's Indoor Hockey Asia Cup in  Taldykorgan
  defeated , 9–2, to win their sixth consecutive Men's Indoor Asia Cup title.  took third place.
 August 10–16: 2015 Women's Indoor Asia Cup in  Nakhon Ratchasima
  defeated , 4–2, to win their fourth consecutive Women's Indoor Asia Cup title.  took third place.
 September 5–13: 2015 Women's Junior Asia Cup in  Changzhou
  defeated , 3–1 in a shoot-out and after a 2–2 score in regular play, to win their third Women's Junior Asia Cup title.  took third place.
 November 14–22: 2015 Men's Junior Asia Cup in  Kuantan
  defeated , 6–2, to win their third Men's Junior Asia Cup title.  took third place.
 December 1–6: 2015 Girls U18 AHF Cup in  Bangkok (debut event)
  defeated  in the final.  took third place.
 December 13–19: 2015 Men's Asian Challenge in  Yangon
 Winner:  (9 points) (first Men's Asian Challenge title)
 Second:  (6 points)
 Third:  (3 points)
 December 21–28: 2015 Women's Asian Challenge in  Bangkok
  defeated , 2–0, in the final.  took the bronze medal.

Pan American Hockey Federation (PAHF)
 October 3–11: Pan American Challenge 2015 for Men and Women in  Chiclayo
 Men:  defeated , 1–0, in the final.  took third place.
 Women:  defeated , 3–1, in the final.  took third place.

Oceania Hockey Federation (OHF)
 October 17–25: 2015 Oceania Cup for Men and Women in  Stratford, New Zealand
 Men:  defeated , 3–2, to win their nine straight Men's Oceania Cup title.  took the bronze medal.
 Women:  defeated , 2–1 in a shootout and after a 1–1 score in regular play, to win their second consecutive and sixth overall Women's Oceania Cup title.  took the bronze medal.

African Hockey Federation (AfHF)
 October 24 – November 1: 2015 Hockey African Cup for Nations for Men and Women in  Johannesburg
 Men:  defeated , 4–2, to win their seventh consecutive Hockey African Cup for Nations title.  took third place.
 First (women):  (sixth consecutive Women's Hockey African Cup for Nations title)
 Second (women): 
 Third (women):

Figure skating

Floorball
 Women's World Floorball Championships
 Champion: 
 Men's under-19 World Floorball Championships
 Champion: 
 Champions Cup
 Men's champion:  IBF Falun
 Women's champion:  KAIS Mora IF

Freestyle skiing

Goalball
 July 5–12: 2015 IBSA Goalball European Championships Men & Women (A Division) in  Kaunas
 Men:  defeated , 9–8, in the men's final match.  won the bronze medal.
 Women: Turkey defeated , 5–0, in the women's final match.  won the bronze medal.
 July 26 – August 1: 2015 IBSA World Youth Games Goalball Championships in  Colorado Springs, Colorado
 Boys:  defeated , 12–2, in the boys' final match. The  won the bronze medal.
 Girls:  defeated the United States, 4–3, in the girls' final match.  won the bronze medal.
 November 5–13: 2015 IBSA Goalball Asia/Pacific Championships in  Hangzhou
 Men:  defeated , 8–4, in the final.  took the bronze medal.
 Women:  defeated , 1–0, in the final.  took the bronze medal.

Golf

Men's major golf championships
 April 9 – 12: 2015 Masters Tournament
 Winner:  Jordan Spieth (first Major title; 3rd PGA Tour win)
 June 18–21: 2015 U.S. Open
 Winner:  Jordan Spieth (second Major title; 4th PGA Tour win)
 July 16–20: 2015 Open Championship
 Winner:  Zach Johnson (first Open Championship title; second Major title; 12th PGA Tour win)
 August 13–16: 2015 PGA Championship
 Winner:  Jason Day (first Major title; 5th PGA Tour win)

WGC
 March 5–8, 2015: 2015 WGC-Cadillac Championship
 Winner:  Dustin Johnson (second WGC title; first WGC-Cadillac Championship title; 10th PGA Tour win)
 April 29 – May 3, 2015: 2015 WGC-Cadillac Match Play
 Winner:  Rory McIlroy (second WGC championship; first WGC-Match Play championship; 10th PGA Tour win)
 August 6–9, 2015: 2015 WGC-Bridgestone Invitational
 Winner:  Shane Lowry (first WGC championship and PGA Tour win)
 November 5–8, 2015: 2015 WGC-HSBC Champions
 Winner:  Russell Knox (first WGC championship, and PGA Tour and European Tour win)

Other men's golf events
 May 21 – 24: 2015 BMW PGA Championship (European Tour)
 Winner:  An Byeong-hun (second Professional win; first European Tour title)
 August 27 – September 27: 2015 FedEx Cup Playoffs
 August 27–30: The Barclays Winner:  Jason Day
 September 4–7: Deutsche Bank Championship Winner:  Rickie Fowler
 September 17–20: BMW Championship Winner:  Jason Day
 September 24–27: The Tour Championship Winner:  Jordan Spieth
 October 8–11: 2015 Presidents Cup in  Incheon
 Team  defeated Team International, 15½ to 14½ points, to win their sixth consecutive and ninth overall Presidents Cup title.

Women's major golf championships
 April 2 – 5: 2015 ANA Inspiration (renamed from Kraft Nabisco Championship)
 Winner:  Brittany Lincicome (second ANA Inspiration and major titles wins; sixth LPGA Tour win)
 June 11–14: 2015 KPMG Women's PGA Championship (renamed from Wegmans LPGA Championship)
 Winner:  Inbee Park (third straight Women's PGA Championship title win; sixth major win; 15th LPGA Tour win)
 July 9–12: 2015 U.S. Women's Open
 Winner:  Chun In-gee (first major, U.S. Women's Open title, and first LPGA Tour win)
 July 30 – August 2: 2015 Women's British Open
 Winner:  Inbee Park (first Women's British Open title; seventh major win; 16th LPGA Tour win)
 September 10–13: 2015 Evian Championship
 Winner:  Lydia Ko (first major title; 9th LPGA Tour win)

Gymnastics

Handball

World handball championships
 January 15 – February 1: 2015 World Men's Handball Championship in 
  defeated , 25–22, to win their fifth World Men's Handball Championship title.  took the bronze medal.
 June 20–26: 2015 IHF Emerging Nations Championship in  Pristina and Gjakova (debut event) 
 The  defeated , 27–24, to win the inaugural IHF Emerging Nations Championship title.  took third place. 
 July 19 – August 1: 2015 Men's Junior World Handball Championship in 
  defeated , 26–24, to win their first Men's Junior World Handball Championship title.  took the bronze medal.
 August 8–20: 2015 Men's Youth World Handball Championship in 
  defeated , 33–26, to win their first Men's Youth World Handball Championship title.  took the bronze medal.
 December 5–20: 2015 World Women's Handball Championship in 

European Handball Federation (EHF)
 September 5, 2014 – May 17, 2015: 2014–15 EHF Cup
  Füchse Berlin defeated fellow German team, HSV Hamburg, 30–27, to win their first EHF Cup title.  Skjern Håndbold took third place.
 September 5, 2014 – May 31, 2015: 2014–15 EHF Champions League
  Barcelona defeated  MKB Veszprém, 28–23, to win their ninth EHF Champions League title.  Vive Targi Kielce took third place.
 September 20, 2014 – May 10, 2015: 2014–15 Women's EHF Champions League
  Budućnost defeated  Larvik HK, 26–22, to win their second Women's EHF Champions League title.  Vardar took third place.
 October 17, 2014 – May 10, 2015: 2014–15 Women's EHF Cup
  Team Tvis Holstebro defeated  Rostov-Don, 55–53, to win their second Women's EHF Cup title. 
 October 18, 2014 – May 10, 2015: 2014–15 Women's EHF Cup Winners' Cup
  Midtjylland defeated  Fleury Loiret HB, 46–42, to win their first Women's EHF Cup Winners' Cup title.
 November 14, 2014 – May 13, 2015: 2014–15 Women's EHF Challenge Cup
  Mios Biganos defeated  Pogoń Baltica Szczecin, 49–44, to win their second Women's EHF Challenge Cup title.
 November 21, 2014 – May 24, 2015: 2014–15 EHF Challenge Cup
  HC Odorheiu Secuiesc defeated  ABC Braga, 60–57 on aggregate, to win their first EHF Challenge Cup title.
 June 26 – July 5: 2015 European Beach Handball Championship in  Lloret de Mar
 Men:  defeated , 2–1, to win their fourth consecutive European Beach Handball Championship title.  took third place.
 Women:  defeated , 2–1, to win their second consecutive Women's European Beach Handball Championship.  took third place.
 July 27 – August 2: 2015 European Women's Junior Handball Championship in 
  defeated , 29–26, to win their fourth European Women's Junior Handball Championship title.  took third place.
 August 13–23: 2015 European Women's Youth Handball Championship in  Skopje
  defeated , 25–24, to win their third European Women's Youth Handball Championship title.  took third place.

Asian Handball Federation (AHF)
 March 14–23: 2015 Asian Women's Handball Championship in  Jakarta
  defeated , 36–22, to win their 12th Asian Women's Handball Championship title.  took third place.
 May 1 – 7: 2015 Asian Men's and Women's Beach Handball Championship in  Muscat, Oman
 Men's team winners:  (4 wins) (Third consecutive Asian Men's Beach Handball Championship title)

 Women's team winners:  (4 wins) (Second consecutive Asian Women's Beach Handball Championship title)

 August 6–14: 2015 Asian Women's Junior Handball Championship in  Almaty
  defeated , 30–29, to win their 13th consecutive Asian Women's Junior Handball Championship title.  took third place.
 August 27 – September 4: 2015 Asian Women's Youth Handball Championship in  New Delhi
  defeated , 27–22, to win their sixth consecutive Asian Women's Youth Handball Championship title.  took third place.
 December 12–22: 2015 Asian Handball Club League Championship (location TBA)

African Handball Confederation (CAHB)
 May 14: 2015 African Handball Super Cup in  Libreville
  Club Africain defeated fellow Tunisian handball team, the Espérance Sportive de Tunis, 26–22. 
 May 14 – 25: 2015 African Handball Cup Winners' Cup in  Libreville
  Espérance Sportive de Tunis defeated  Al Ahly SC, 27–26, to win their second consecutive and third overall African Handball Cup Winners' Cup title.  Club Africain Handball Team took third place.
 May 15: 2015 African Women's Handball Super Cup in  Libreville
  C.D. Primeiro de Agosto defeated fellow Angolan team, the Atlético Petróleos de Luanda, 32–28.
 May 15–24: 2015 African Women's Handball Cup Winners' Cup in  Libreville
  C.D. Primeiro de Agosto defeated  Africa Sports, 36–22, to win their first African Women's Handball Cup Winners' Cup title.  ABO Sport took third place. 
 July 1–9: 2015 African Women's Youth Handball Championship in  Nairobi
  defeated , 32–26, to win their first African Women's Youth Handball Championship title. The  took third place.
 July 11–18: 2015 African Women's Junior Handball Championship in  Nairobi
 First place:  (11 points; GD: +74) (eighth African Women's Junior Handball Championship title)
 Second place:  (11 points; GD: +72)
 Third place:  (6 points)
 October 21–30: 2015 African Handball Champions League for Men and Women in  Nador
 Men:  Zamalek SC defeated  Club Africain, 35–22, to win their ninth African Handball Champions League title.  Alexandria Sporting Club took third place.
 Women:  C.D. Primeiro de Agosto defeated fellow Angolan team, the Atlético Petróleos de Luanda, 23–21, to win their second consecutive African Women's Handball Champions League title.  FAP Yaoundé took third place.

Pan-American Team Handball Federation (PATHF)
 March 24–28: 2015 Pan American Men's Junior Handball Championship in  Foz do Iguaçu
  defeated , 34–23, to win their fifth Pan American Men's Junior Handball Championship title.  took third place.
 March 30 – April 5: Women's Handball PATHF North American Championship 2015 in  Salinas
  defeated , 34–25, in the final.  took third place.
 April 21 – 25: 2015 Pan American Men's Youth Handball Championship in  San Cristóbal
  defeated , 30–20, to win their fifth Pan American Men's Youth Handball Championship title.  took third place.
 May 20– 24: 2015 Pan American Men's Club Handball Championship in  Taubaté
  Handebol Taubaté defeated fellow Brazilian team, the EC Pinheiros, 26–20, to win their third Pan American Men's Club Handball Championship title.  River Plate took third place.
 May 21 – 28: 2015 Pan American Women's Handball Championship in  Havana
  defeated , 26–22, to win their ninth Pan American Women's Handball Championship title.  took third place.

Oceania Continent Handball Federation (OCHF)
 June 6–8: 2015 Oceania Handball Champions Cup in  Sydney
  Sydney University HC defeated fellow Australian team, St Kilda HC, 23–16, to win their fourth consecutive Oceania Handball Champions Cup title.  AS Dumbea took third place.

IHF Super Globe
 September 7–10: 2015 IHF Super Globe in  Doha
  Füchse Berlin defeated  MKB Veszprém, 28–27 at extra time, to win their first IHF Super Globe title.  FC Barcelona took third place.

Ice hockey

Judo

Luge

Mixed martial arts

 January 3: UFC 182: Jon Jones defeated Daniel Cormier in  Las Vegas
 January 31: UFC 183:  Anderson Silva defeated Nick Diaz in  Las Vegas
 February 28: UFC 184: Ronda Rousey defeated Cat Zingano in  Los Angeles
 March 14: UFC 185:  Rafael dos Anjos defeated Anthony Pettis in  Dallas
 April 25: UFC 186: Demetrious Johnson defeated  Kyoji Horiguchi in  Montreal
 May 23: UFC 187: Daniel Cormier defeated Anthony Johnson in  Las Vegas
 June 13: UFC 188:  Fabrício Werdum vs Cain Velasquez in  Mexico City
 July 11: UFC 189:  José Aldo vs  Conor McGregor in  Las Vegas
 August 1: UFC 190: Ronda Rousey vs  Bethe Correia in  Rio de Janeiro

Modern pentathlon

Motorsport

Mountain bike racing

Multi-sport events
 January 31 – February 8: 2015 Winter World Masters Games in  Quebec City
 For results, click here.
 February 4–14: 2015 Winter Universiade in  Štrbské Pleso/Osrblie and  Granada
 Note: Four sports would be contested in Slovakia from January 24 – February 1, due to little confidence by the FISU about Granada hosting these events.
  Štrbské Pleso / Osrblie venue:  won both the gold and overall medal tallies.
  Granada venue:  won both the gold and overall medal tallies.
 March 28 – April 5: 2015 Winter Deaflympics in  Khanty-Mansiysk
 Host nation, won both the gold and overall medal tallies.
 May 8–18: 2015 IBSA World Championships and Games in  Seoul
  won both the gold and overall medal tallies.
 June 1–6: 2015 Games of the Small States of Europe in  Reykjavík
 Host nation, won both the gold and overall medal tallies.
 June 5–16: 2015 Southeast Asian Games in 
  won the gold medal tally. Host nation, won the overall medal tally.
 June 12–28: 2015 European Games in  Baku (debut event)
  won both the gold and overall medal tallies.
 June 26 – July 5: 2015 World Police and Fire Games in  Fairfax County, Virginia
 The  won both the gold and overall medal tallies.
 June 27 – July 3: 2015 Island Games in 
 Host island, won both the gold and overall medal tallies.
 July 2–8: 2015 IWAS World Junior Games in  Stadskanaal
 For results, click here.
 July 3–14: 2015 Summer Universiade in  Gwangju
  won the gold medal tally.  won the overall medal tally.
 July 4–18: 2015 Pacific Games in  Port Moresby
  won both the gold and overall medal tallies.
 July 10–26: 2015 Pan American Games in  Toronto
 The  won both the gold and overall medal tallies.
 July 25 – August 2: 2015 Special Olympics World Summer Games in  Los Angeles
 For results, click here.
 August 1–9: 2015 Indian Ocean Island Games in  Saint-Denis, Réunion
  Réunion won both the gold and overall medal tallies.
 August 7–15: 2015 Parapan American Games in  Toronto
  won both the gold and overall medal tallies.
 August 7–16: 2015 CPISRA World Games in  Nottingham
  won both the gold and overall medal tallies.
 August 28 – September 6: 2015 Mediterranean Beach Games in  Pescara (debut event)
  won both the gold and overall medal tallies.
 September 4–19: 2015 All-Africa Games in  Brazzaville
  won both the gold and overall medal tallies.
 September 5–11: 2015 Commonwealth Youth Games in  Apia
  won both the gold and overall medal tallies.
 September 26 – October 3: 2015 IWAS World Games in  Sochi
  won both the gold and overall medal tallies.
 October 1–10: 2015 European Masters Games in  Nice
 For results, click here.
 October 2–11: 2015 Military World Games in  Mungyeong
  won both the gold and overall medal tallies.
 December 3–9: 2015 ASEAN Para Games in 
  won both the gold and overall medal tallies.

Nordic combined

Nordic skiing

Racquetball

Road cycling

Roller sport
 May 28 & 29: 2015 Inline Hockey World Masters Cup in  Düsseldorf
 Winners: 
 June 20 & 21: 2015 Inline Downhill World Championships in  Cisterna d'Asti
 Men's time trial winner:  Angelo Vecchi
 Women's time trial winner:  Séverine Christ Thomas
 Men's Cross winner:  Christian Montavon
 Women's Cross winner:  Annalena Rettenberger
 June 7–13: Men's Inline Hockey FIRS Junior World Championship 2015 in  Rosario
 Men's winners: 
 Women's winners: 
 Men's Junior winners: 
 June 20–27: 2015 Rink Hockey "A" World Championship in  La Roche-sur-Yon
 In final  defeated  6–1.  took third place.
 August 21–23: Women's Flat Track Derby Association Division 2 Tournament in  Cleveland, Ohio
 Hosts: Burning River Roller Derby
 Qualifying tournament for the WFTDA International Championships in St. Paul, Minnesota
 Qualifying to advance:  Demolition City Dynamite Dames,  Kansas City Roller Warriors.
 August 28–30: Women's Flat Track Derby Association Division 2 Tournament in  Detroit, Michigan
 Hosts: Detroit Derby Girls
 Qualifying tournament for the WFTDA International Championships in St. Paul, Minnesota
 Qualifying to advance:  Sacred City Sacrificers,  Music City All-Stars.
 September 4–6: Women's Flat Track Derby Association Division 1 Tournament in  Tucson, Arizona
 Hosts: Tucson Roller Derby
 Qualifying tournament for the WFTDA International Championships in St. Paul, Minnesota
 Qualifying to advance:  Arch Rival All-Stars,  Bay Area All-Stars,  Victorian Roller Derby League.
 September 11–13: Women's Flat Track Derby Association Division 1 Tournament in  Dallas, Texas
 Hosts: Dallas Derby Devils
 Qualifying tournament for the WFTDA International Championships in St. Paul, Minnesota
 Qualifying to advance:  Rat City All-Stars,  Texas Texecutioners,  Rose City Wheels of Justice.
 September 17–26: Roller Skating FIRS Artistic World Championships 2015 in  Cali

  won both the gold and overall medal tallies.
 September 18–20: Women's Flat Track Derby Association Division 1 Tournament in  Jacksonville, Florida
 Hosts: Jacksonville Rollergirls
 Qualifying tournament for the WFTDA International Championships in St. Paul, Minnesota
 Qualifying to advance:  Denver Roller Derby Mile-High Club,  New Jax City All-Stars,  London Brawling.
 September 19–26: 2015 Rink Hockey "U20" World Championship in  Vilanova i la Geltrú
 In the final  defeated  4–3.  took third place.
 October 2–4: Women's Flat Track Derby Association Division 1 Tournament in  Omaha, Nebraska
 Hosts: Omaha Rollergirls
 Qualifying tournament for the WFTDA International Championships in St. Paul, Minnesota
 Qualifying to advance:  Minnesota RollerGirls All-Stars,  Angel City Hollywood Scarlets,  Gotham Girls All-Stars.
 October 26–30: 2015 Inline Freestyle World Championships in  Torino
  won both the gold and overall medal tallies.
 November 6–8: 2015 Women's Flat Track Derby Association International Championships in  Saint Paul, Minnesota
 Hosts: Minnesota RollerGirls
 Division 2 results: 
 Bronze:  Demolition City Dynamite Dames, Evansville, Indiana
 Silver:  Music City All-Stars, Nashville, Tennessee
 Gold:  Sacred City Sacrificers, Sacramento, California
 Division 1 results:
 Bronze:  Victorian Roller Derby League, Melbourne, Victoria
 Silver:   Gotham Girls All-Stars, New York City
 Gold:  Rose City Wheels of Justice, Portland, Oregon
 Tournament MVP: Scald Eagle of the Rose City Rollers
 November 13–22: 2015 Roller Speed Skating World Championships in  Kaohsiung
  won both the gold and overall medal tallies.

Rowing

Rugby union

 October 10, 2014 – April 3, 2015: 2014–15 British and Irish Cup
  Worcester Warriors defeated  Doncaster R.F.C. 35–5 to win first British and Irish Cup title.
 October 11, 2014 – May 17, 2015: 2014–15 Sevens World Series
  winning the Sevens World Series for the 2nd time beating  by 10 points in the overall standings.  came in third.
 October 17, 2014 – May 2, 2015: 2014–15 European Rugby Champions Cup (final at the  Twickenham Stadium)
  Toulon defeated fellow French team, Clermont, 24–18, to win a third consecutive European club title. 
 December 4, 2014 – May 23, 2015: 2014–15 World Rugby Women's Sevens Series
  winning the World Rugby Women's Sevens Series for the third time beating  by 12 points in the overall standings.  came in third.
 February 5 – March 20: 2015 Six Nations Under 20s Championship
 Winner:  (8 points); Second:  (6 points and PF of 145); Third:  (6 points and PF of 115)
 February 6 – March 21: 2015 Six Nations Championship
 Champions:  (13th title)
 Calcutta Cup winner: 
 Millennium Trophy winner: 
 Centenary Quaich winner: 
 Giuseppe Garibaldi Trophy winner: 
 February 6 – March 22: 2015 Women's Six Nations Championship
 Champions:  (second title)
 Triple Crown winner: 
 February 12 – July 4: 2015 Super Rugby season
 The  Highlanders defeated fellow New Zealand team, the Hurricanes, 21–14, to win their first Super Rugby title.
 March 9–23: 2015 World Rugby Pacific Challenge (renamed from IRB Nations Cup)
  Pampas XV defeated the  Fiji Warriors, 17–9, at the final match.  Canada A took third place. 
  defeated , 49–24, to win their first World Rugby Under 20 Trophy title.  took third place.
  defeated , 21–16, to win their fifth World Rugby Under 20 Championship title.  took third place.
 July 17 – August 8: 2015 Rugby Championship
 Champions:  (fourth title overall, first in Rugby Championship era)
 Bledisloe Cup winner: 
 Freedom Cup winner: New Zealand
 Mandela Challenge Plate winner: Australia
 Puma Trophy winner: Australia
 Also notable is that  finished in third place, marking the first time they had finished above the bottom of the table since entering the competition in 2012.
 July 18 – August 3: 2015 World Rugby Pacific Nations Cup
  defeated , 39–29, to win their third World Rugby Pacific Nations Cup title.  took third place.
 August 7–14: 2015 IWRF Americas Championship (Part of the 2015 Parapan American Games)
 September 15–19: 2015 IWRF European Championship in  Pajulahti
  defeated , 49–48, to win their fifth IWRF European Championship title.  took the bronze medal.
  defeated , 34–17, to win their second consecutive and third overall Rugby World Cup title.  took the bronze medal.
 October 12–16: 2015 World Wheelchair Rugby Challenge in  London
 October 26 – November 1: 2015 IWRF Asia-Oceania Championship in  Chiba
  defeated , 56–51, to win their first IWRF Asia-Oceania Championship title.  took the bronze medal.

Sailing

Shooting

 January 2 – December 6: 2015 ISSF Shooting Calendar

ISSF World Cup
 February 28 – March 10: World Cup #1 for the Shotgun only in  Acapulco
 Men's Trap winner:  Massimo Fabbrizi
 Men's Double Trap winner:  Jeffrey Holguín
 Men's Skeet winner:  Vincent Hancock
 Women's Trap winner:  Corey Cogdell
 Women's Skeet winner:  Kim Rhode
 March 19–29: World Cup #2 for the Shotgun only in  Al Ain
 Men's Trap winner:  David Kostelecký
 Men's Double Trap winner:  Vasily Mosin
 Men's Skeet winner:  Anthony Terras
 Women's Trap winner:  Silvana Stanco
 Women's Skeet winner:  Diana Bacosi
 April 8 – 16: World Cup #1 for the Rifle and Pistol in  Changwon
 Men's 10m Air Pistol winner:  Jin Jong-oh 
 Men's 10m Air Rifle winner:  Péter Sidi 
 Men's 25m Rapid Fire Pistol winner:  Jean Quiquampoix 
 Men's 50m Pistol winner:  ZHANG Bowen 
 Men's 50m Rifle 3 Positions winner:  HUI Zicheng 
 Men's 50m Rifle Prone winner:  Matthew Emmons 
 Women's 10m Air Pistol winner:  Liubov Yaskevich 
 Women's 10 m Air Rifle winner:  Snježana Pejčić 
 Women's 25m Pistol winner:  Otryadyn Gündegmaa 
 Women's 50m Rifle 3 Positions winner:  Snježana Pejčić
 April 24 – May 4: World Cup #3 for the Shotgun only in  Larnaca
 Men's Trap winner:  David Kostelecký
 Men's Double Trap winner:  Antonino Barilla
 Men's Skeet winner:  Saif Bin Futtais
 Women's Trap winner:  Satu Mäkelä-Nummela
 Women's Skeet winner:  Diana Bacosi
 May 11–19: World Cup #2 for the Rifle and Pistol in  Fort Benning
 Men's 10m Air Pistol winner:  Jin Jong-oh
 Men's 10m Air Rifle winner:  Milutin Stefanović
 Men's 25m Rapid Fire Pistol winner:  Oliver Geis
 Men's 50m Pistol winner:  Damir Mikec
 Men's 50m Rifle 3 Positions winner:  Yuriy Yurkov
 Men's 50m Rifle Prone winner:  Michael McPhail
 Women's 10m Air Pistol winner:  Antoaneta Boneva
 Women's 10 m Air Rifle winner:  Andrea Arsović
 Women's 25m Pistol winner:  Otryadyn Gündegmaa
 Women's 50m Rifle 3 Positions winner:  CHANG Jing
 May 26 – June 2: World Cup #3 for the Rifle and Pistol in  Munich #1
 Men's 10m Air Pistol winner:  João Costa
 Men's 10m Air Rifle winner:  Zhu Qinan
 Men's 25m Rapid Fire Pistol winner:  Christian Reitz
 Men's 50m Pistol winner:  João Costa
 Men's 50m Rifle 3 Positions winner:  Andre Link
 Men's 50m Rifle Prone winner:  Michael McPhail
 Women's 10m Air Pistol winner:  Antoaneta Boneva
 Women's 10m Air Rifle winner:  Yi Siling
 Women's 25m Pistol winner:  ZHANG Jingjing
 Women's 50m Rifle 3 Positions winner:  Barbara Engleder
 August 6–16: World Cup for all Three Guns in  Gabala
 Men's 50m Pistol winner:  Mai Jiajie
 Men's 50m Rifle 3 Positions winner:  Hui Zicheng
 Men's 10m Air Rifle winner:  Cao Yifei
 Men's 10m Air Pistol winner:  Kim Cheong-yong
 Men's Skeet winner:  Vincent Hancock
 Men's Double Trap winner:  Walton Eller
 Men's 50m Rifle Prone winner:  Kirill Grigoryan
 Men's 25m Rapid Fire Pistol winner:  Hu Haozhe
 Men's Trap winner:  Alexey Alipov
 Women's 10m Air Rifle winner:  Elaheh Ahmadi
 Women's 25m Pistol winner:  Cao Lijia
 Women's 10m Air Pistol winner:  Zorana Arunović
 Women's 50m Rifle 3 Positions winner:  Chen Dongqi
 Women's Skeet winner:  Katiuscia Spada
 Women's Trap winner:  Yukie Nakayama
 September 1–7: World Cup #4 for the Rifle and Pistol (final) in  Munich #2
 Men's 10m Air Pistol winner:  Vladimir Isakov
 Men's 10m Air Rifle winner:  Yang Haoran
 Men's 25m Rapid Fire Pistol winner:  Jean Quiquampoix
 Men's 50m Pistol winner:  ZHANG Bowen 
 Men's 50m Rifle Prone winner:  Michael McPhail
 Men's 50m Rifle Three Positions winner:  Matthew Emmons
 Women's 10m Air Pistol winner:  Zorana Arunović
 Women's 10m Air Rifle winner:  Elaheh Ahmadi
 Women's 25m Pistol winner:  ZHANG Jingjing
 Women's 50m Rifle Three Positions winner:  Selina Gschwandtner
 October 15–21: World Cup #4 for the Shotgun only (final) in  Nicosia
 Men's Skeet winner:  Gabriele Rossetti
 Women's Skeet winner:  Amber Hill
 Men's Trap winner:  Giovanni Cernogoraz
 Women's Trap winner:  Alessandra Perilli
 Men's Double Trap winner:  Steven Scott

IPC Shooting World Cup
 March 30 – November 7: 2015 IPC Shooting World Cup
 March 30 – April 1: World Cup #1 in  Stoke Mandeville, Buckinghamshire

  won both the gold and overall medal tallies.
 April 18 – 21: World Cup #2 in  Szczecin

  won both the gold and overall medal tallies.
 May 12 – 15: World Cup #3 in  Antalya

  and  won 6 gold medals each. Great Britain won the overall medal tally.
 July 10–14: World Cup #4 in  Osijek
  won both the gold and overall medal tallies.
 September 15–19: World Cup #5 in  Sydney
  won both the gold and overall medal tallies.
 November 3–7: World Cup #6 (final) in  Fort Benning
  and  won 3 gold medals each. Great Britain and  won 6 overall medals each.

Other shooting championships
 March 2–8: 2015 European 10 m Events Championships in  Arnhem
**  won both the gold and overall medal tallies.
 June 25 – July 2: 2015 ISSF Junior Cup in  Suhl
  won both the gold and overall medal tallies.
 July 19 – August 2: 2015 European Shooting Championships in  Maribor
  won both the gold and overall medal tallies.
 September 9–18: 2015 World Shotgun Championships in  Lonato

Italy and the United States won 12 overall medals each.
 September 25 – October 1: 2015 Asian 10 m Events Championships in  New Delhi

  won both the gold and overall medal tallies.
 November 1–12: 2015 Asian Shooting Championships in  Kuwait City
 Note: This event was stripped of the Rio 2016 Olympic Qualification status, per orders from the IOC.

  and  won 16 gold medals each. South Korea won the overall medal tally.
 November 25 – December 3: 2015 Oceania Shooting Championships in  Sydney
  won both the gold and overall medal tallies.
 November 28 – December 7: 2015 African Shooting Championships in  Cairo
  won both the gold and overall medal tallies.

Ski jumping

Snooker

Players Tour Championship
 June 17, 2014 – March 28, 2015: Players Tour Championship 2014/2015
 June 17–21: Asian Tour 2014/2015 – Event 1 in  Yixing
  Ding Junhui defeated  Michael Holt 4–2.
 August 7–10: European Tour 2014/2015 – Event 1 in  Riga
  Mark Selby defeated  Mark Allen 4–3.
 August 20–24: European Tour 2014/2015 – Event 2 in  Fürth
  Mark Allen defeated  Judd Trump 4–2.
 October 1–5: European Tour 2014/2015 – Event 3 in  Sofia
  Shaun Murphy defeated  Martin Gould 4–2.
 October 20–24: Asian Tour 2014/2015 – Event 2 in  Haining
  Stuart Bingham defeated  Oliver Lines 4–0.
 November 11–23: European Tour 2014/2015 – Event 4 in  Mülheim
  Shaun Murphy defeated  Robert Milkins 4–0.
 December 11–14: European Tour 2014/2015 – Event 5 in  Lisbon
  Stephen Maguire defeated  Matthew Selt 4–2.
 January 20–24: Asian Tour 2014/2015 – Event 3 in  Xuzhou
  Joe Perry defeated  Thepchaiya Un-Nooh 4–1.
 February 25 – March 1: European Tour 2014/2015 – Event 6 in  Gdynia
  Neil Robertson defeated  Mark Williams 4–0.
 March 24–28: Players Tour Championship 2014/2015 – Finals in  Bangkok
  Joe Perry defeated  Mark Williams 4–3.

Snooker season
 May 10, 2014 – May 4, 2015: Snooker season 2014/2015
 May 8–11: 2014 Vienna Snooker Open in  Vienna
  Mark King defeated  Nigel Bond 5–2.
 June 4–8: 2014 Pink Ribbon in  Gloucester
  Peter Lines defeated  Lee Walker 4–1.
 June 23–29: 2014 Wuxi Classic in  Wuxi
  Neil Robertson defeated  Joe Perry 10–9.
 June 30 – July 6: 2014 Australian Goldfields Open in  Bendigo
  Judd Trump defeated  Neil Robertson 9–5.
 September 1–6: 2014 Six-red World Championship in  Bangkok
  Stephen Maguire defeated  Ricky Walden 8–7.
 September 8–14: 2014 Shanghai Masters in  Shanghai
  Stuart Bingham defeated  Mark Allen 10–3.
 October 10–18: 2014 General Cup in  Hong Kong
  Ali Carter defeated  Shaun Murphy 7–6. 
 October 26 – November 2: 2014 International Championship in  Chengdu
  Ricky Walden defeated  Mark Allen 10–7.
 November 3–9: 2014 Champion of Champions in  Coventry
  Ronnie O'Sullivan defeated  Judd Trump 10–7.
 November 25 – December 7: 2014 UK Championship in  York
  Ronnie O'Sullivan defeated  Judd Trump 10–9.
 January 11–18: 2015 Masters in  London
  Shaun Murphy defeated  Neil Robertson 10–2.
 February 4–8: 2015 German Masters in  Berlin
  Mark Selby defeated  Shaun Murphy 9–7.
 January 5 – February 12: 2015 Championship League in  Stock
  Stuart Bingham defeated  Mark Davis 3–2.
 February 16–22: 2015 Welsh Open in  Cardiff
  John Higgins defeated  Ben Woollaston 9–3.
 March 2–3: 2015 World Seniors Championship in  Blackpool
  Mark Williams defeated  Fergal O'Brien 2–1.
 March 4–6: 2015 Snooker Shoot-Out in  Blackpool
  Michael White defeated  Xiao Guodong 1–0.
 March 10–14: 2015 Indian Open in  Mumbai
  Michael White defeated  Ricky Walden 5–0.
 March 16–22: 2015 World Grand Prix in  Llandudno
  Judd Trump defeated  Ronnie O'Sullivan 10–7.
 March 30 – April 5: 2015 China Open in  Beijing
  Mark Selby defeated  Gary Wilson 10–2.
 April 18 – May 4: 2015 World Snooker Championship in  Sheffield
  Stuart Bingham defeated  Shaun Murphy 18–15.

Snowboarding

Softball

Little League World Series (softball)
 August 2–19: 2015 Little League World Series Schedule for Softball
 August 2–8: 2015 Senior League Softball in  Sussex County at the Little League Complex
 Team West ( Missoula) defeated Team Central ( Escanaba), 10–0, in the final. 
 August 2–8: 2015 Junior League World Series Softball in  Kirkland at Everest Park
 Team Southeast ( Tampa, Florida) defeated Team Asia-Pacific ( Norzagaray, Bulacan), 9–2, in the final. 
 August 2–9: 2015 Big League Softball in  Sussex County at the Little League Complex
 Team Southwest ( Monroe, Louisiana) defeated Team West ( Antelope Valley), 9–1, in the final.
 August 13–19: 2015 Little League Softball in  Portland at the Alpenrose Stadium
 Team Southeast ( Salisbury, North Carolina) defeated Team East ( Warwick, Rhode Island), 4–2, in the final.

International softball
 June 26 – July 5: 2015 ISF Men's World Championship in  Saskatoon
  defeated , 10–5, to win their first ISF Men's World Championship title.  took the bronze medal.
 June 29 – July 5: 2015 World Cup of Softball in  Irvine, California
 The  defeated , 6–1, to win their eighth World Cup of Softball title.  took the bronze medal.
 August 9–15: 2015 ISF Junior Women's World Championship in  Oklahoma City
 The  defeated , 8–1, to win their fifth ISF Junior Women's World Championship title.  took the bronze medal.

Speed skating

Sport climbing

 May 14 – 16: Sport Climbing IFSC Bouldering European Championships 2015 in  Innsbruck
 Men's Bouldering winner:  Jan Hojer
 Women's Bouldering winner:  Juliane Wurm
 November 20–22: Sport Climbing IFSC Asian Championships 2015 in  Ningbo
 Women's Lead winner:  Kim Ja-in
 Women's Speed winner:  Tita Suptia
 Women's Bouldering winner:  Miho Nonaka
 Men's Lead winner:  Keiichiro Korenaga
 Men's Speed winner:  Galar Pandu Asmoro
 Men's Bouldering winner:  Tsukuru Hori

2015 IFSC Climbing World Cup
 May 17: IFSC Climbing World Cup #1 in  Central Saanich
 Women's Speed winner:  Iuliia Kaplina
 Men's Speed winner:  Qixin Zhong
 May 30 & 31: IFSC Climbing World Cup #2 in  Toronto
 Women's Bouldering winner:  Anna Stöhr
 Men's Bouldering winner:  Alban Levier
 June 5 & 6: IFSC Climbing World Cup #3 in  Vail
 Women's Bouldering winner:  Megan Mascarenas
 Men's Bouldering winner:  Jan Hojer
 June 20 & 21: IFSC Climbing World Cup #4 in  Chongqing
 Women's Bouldering winner:  Akiyo Noguchi
 Men's Bouldering winner:  Sean McColl
 Women's Speed winner:  Mariia Krasavina
 Men's Speed winner:  Qixin Zhong
 June 26 & 27: IFSC Climbing World Cup #5 in  Haiyang
 Women's Bouldering winner:  Petra Klingler
 Men's Bouldering winner:  Jongwon Chon
 Women's Speed winner:  Anouck Jaubert
 Men's Speed winner:  Qixin Zhong
 July 10–12: IFSC Climbing World Cup #6 in  Chamonix
 Women's Speed winner:  Anouck Jaubert
 Men's Speed winner:  Libor Hroza
 Women's Lead winner:  Mina Markovič
 Men's Lead winner:  Ramón Julián Puigblanque
 July 17 & 18: IFSC Climbing World Cup #7 in  Briançon
 Women's Lead winner:  Kim Ja-in
 Men's Lead winner:  Gautier Supper
 July 31 – August 1: IFSC Climbing World Cup #8 in  Imst
 Women's Lead winner:  Mina Markovič
 Men's Lead winner:  Romain Desgranges
 August 14 & 15: IFSC Climbing World Cup #9 in  Munich
 Finals in Bouldering
 Women's Bouldering winner:  Shauna Coxsey
 Men's Bouldering winner:  Alexey Rubtsov
 August 21 & 22: IFSC Climbing World Cup #10 in  Stavanger
 Women's Lead winner:  Mina Markovič
 Men's Lead winner:  Gautier Supper
 September 26 & 27: IFSC Climbing World Cup #11 in  Puurs
 Women's Lead winner:  Kim Ja-in
 Men's Lead winner:  Domen Škofic
 October 17 & 18: IFSC Climbing World Cup #13 in  Wujiang
 Fnals in speed
 Women's Speed winner:  Mariia Krasavina
 Men's Speed winner:  Reza Alipourshena
 Women's Lead winner:  Kim Ja-in
 Men's Lead winner:  Adam Ondra

Squash

Table tennis

Taekwondo

Tennis

Track cycling

Trial cycling

Triathlon

Volleyball

Water polo

Weightlifting

Wrestling

References

 
Sports by year
Test events for the 2016 Summer Olympic and Paralympic Games